Triethylene glycol dinitrate (TEGDN) is a nitrated alcohol ester of triethylene glycol. It is used as an energetic plasticizer in explosives and propellants. Its chemical formula is O2N-O-CH2CH2-O-CH2CH2-O-CH2CH2-O-NO2. It is a pale yellow oily liquid. It is somewhat similar to nitroglycerin.

TEGDN is often used together with trimethylolethane trinitrate (TMETN).

Triethylene glycol dinitrate, diethylene glycol dinitrate, and trimethylolethane trinitrate are being considered as replacements for nitroglycerin in propellants.

References

Nitrate esters
Explosive chemicals
Liquid explosives
Monopropellants
Plasticizers